Notch may refer to:
 Notch (engineering), an indentation or slit in a material
 Nock (arrow), notch in the rearmost end of an arrow
 Markus Persson (born 1979), a Swedish game designer known by his online alias "Notch", best known for creating Minecraft
 Notch (musician) (born 1973), a hip hop, R&B, reggae, dancehall and reggaeton artist
 NOTCH (magazine), an Indian entertainment and lifestyle magazine
 Notch, Missouri, a community in the United States
 Notch signalling pathway, a cell signalling system present in most multicellular organisms
 Notch proteins, a family of transmembrane proteins
 Notch filter, a band-stop filter with a narrow stopband
 Notch test, also known as Charpy impact test
 Lion Notch, a male lion featured in the nature documentary series Big Cat Diary
 Notch display, an electronic screen with a cutout in it
 A type of col in geomorphology

See also
 
 
 Top Notch (disambiguation)
 Niche (disambiguation)
 Nutch, an open-source search engine